"Dope" is a song by American rapper Tyga with a guest appearance from fellow rapper Rick Ross. The song was originally titled "187" but was later changed to "Dope". It was released on January 15, 2013 as the first single from his third album Hotel California (2013). Co-written by both artists and produced by FKi and Jess Jackson, the song samples "Deep Cover" by Dr. Dre and Snoop Dogg.

The song received mixed reviews from critics who felt that it paled in comparison to the original hip-hop classic. "Dope" managed to peak at number 68 on the Billboard Hot 100. It fared better charting at numbers 15 and 19 on the Hot Rap Songs and Hot R&B/Hip-Hop Songs charts respectively. The song was certified gold by the Recording Industry Association of America (RIAA), denoting sales of over 500,000 copies. It received similar chart presence in Canada, peaking at number 72 on the Canadian Hot 100.

The accompanying music video for the song was directed by Colin Tilley and features Tyga getting in a car chase with the cops throughout the city.

Music video 
The music video was released on January 18, 2013, and was directed by Colin Tilley. The video begins with Tyga walking up to a parked car and shooting the driver. Tyga then gets into his own car and drives away. Right as he drives away cops begin to follow him and a high speed chase around the city begins. The rest of the video switches between scenes of the car chase and Tyga rapping inside a mansion with Rick Ross.

Critical reception 
"Dope" received mixed reviews from music critics. AllMusic's David Jeffries said that the track was "the almost worthy "Rack City" successor with [Rick] Ross on the shot callers cut." Chayne Japal of Exclaim! said that it was an interesting take on the song but that it "ultimately crumbles with Tyga's inappropriate implementation of the non-chorus." Steve 'Flash' Juon of RapReviews felt that producers FKi stripped the song of almost everything that made the original well-regarded and doesn't standout as much.

Chart performance 
"Dope" debuted and peaked at number 68 on the US Billboard Hot 100 for the week of February 9, 2013 and stayed on the chart for ten weeks. That same week, it debuted at number 15 on the US Hot Rap Songs chart and number 19 on the US Hot R&B/Hip-Hop Songs chart. On December 10, 2013, the song was certified gold by the Recording Industry Association of America (RIAA) for selling over 500,000 copies in the United States. In Canada, it debuted at number 72 on the Canadian Hot 100 before leaving the next week.

Track listing

Charts

Weekly charts

Year-end charts

Certifications

Release history

References 

2013 singles
2013 songs
Tyga songs
Rick Ross songs
Cash Money Records singles
Music videos directed by Colin Tilley
Songs written by Rick Ross
Songs written by Tyga